NHS Forth Valley is one of the fourteen regions of NHS Scotland. It provides healthcare services in the Clackmannanshire, Falkirk and Stirling area. NHS Forth Valley is headquartered in Castle Business Park, Stirling.

Hospitals
NHS Forth Valley is one of 14 regional health boards and serves a population of around 300,000 in a diverse geographical area which covers the heart of Scotland. The Health Board controls an annual budget of £570 million, and employs around 8000 staff. Forth Valley Royal Hospital in Larbert  is supported by a network of four community facilities, 57 health centres, day centres providing care and support for patients with mental illness and learning disabilities and a wide range of community based services.

Forth Valley
Clackmannanshire, Falkirk and Stirling

Falkirk
 Falkirk Community Hospital

Outwith Falkirk
 Bellsdyke Hospital, Larbert
 Bo'ness Hospital
 Forth Valley Royal Hospital, Larbert

Stirling
 Stirling Health and Care Village

References

External links 
 

 
Health in Forth Valley
Organisations based in Stirling (council area)
2004 establishments in Scotland